The Sicilian Defence is the twelfth studio album by The Alan Parsons Project, released in 2014. It was named after the Sicilian Defence, a famous chess opening. This was the final Alan Parsons Project studio album to be released, 24 years after the split of the band, and it has so far only been available as part of the eleven-CD box set The Complete Albums Collection (which omits the original mix of  Tales of Mystery and Imagination and all bonus tracks from previous expanded reissues).

Originally recorded in 1979, it was never actually intended for release, but was sent to the band's label, Arista, as a sort of "chess move" as they did not feel they were given adequate time to make a new album while Eric Woolfson negotiated their contract, but were under obligation to deliver one anyway. As such, this album consists of incomplete sketches that were never fleshed out into proper songs, and whose titles follow a particular variation of the chess opening.  was the first track to be released from the album, when a shortened version of it entitled "Elsie's Theme" was included on the 2008 remastered edition of Eve. It is thus the only track to be given a formal title unrelated to a chess move.

Quotes

Track listing
All songs composed by Eric Woolfson.

"P-K4" (Instrumental) – 5:00
"P-QB4" (Instrumental) – 6:22
"Kt-KB3" (Instrumental) – 3:07
"...Kt-QB3" (Instrumental) – 1:15
"P-Q4" (Instrumental) – 3:54
"PxP" (Instrumental) – 3:27
"KtxP" (Instrumental) – 4:01
"Kt-B3" (Instrumental) – 0:53
"Kt-QB3" (Instrumental) – 8:16
"P-Q3" (Instrumental) – 3:30

Personnel
Alan Parsons – keyboards, synthesizer, programming, producer, engineer
Eric Woolfson – piano

Notes

References

External links
https://www.billboard.com/articles/news/6028786/alan-parsons-project-sicilian-defence-song-premiere
https://web.archive.org/web/20110716215331/http://www.the-alan-parsons-project.com/history-read-more.html

The Alan Parsons Project albums
Concept albums
2014 albums
Albums produced by Alan Parsons
Arista Records albums